William Franklin Switzler (March 16, 1819 – May 24, 1906) was an American lawyer, journalist, publisher, and historian from Columbia, Missouri.

Biography

William F. Switzler was born in Fayette County, Kentucky. In 1826 his family moved to Fayette, Missouri.

He studied law under Abiel Leonard and James Sidney Rollins, and practiced it for several years. In 1841 he started editing the Columbia Patriot eventually going into journalism business. He printed the Columbia Statesman; later in his life he edited the Chillicothe Constitution and Missouri Democrat (Boonville, Mo.).

During the American Civil War, in 1863, he was appointed a provost marshal for the 9th District of Missouri.

He served as a State Representative for Boone County, Missouri and twice, in 1866 and 1888 ran for Congress, unsuccessfully. In 1885 he was appointed Chief of the Bureau of Statistics in Washington, D.C.

He published Switzler's illustrated history of Missouri, from 1541 to 1877 in 1879, and in 1882 — a History of Boone County, Missouri.

He died in Columbia, Missouri, aged 87.

His papers are preserved by the State Historical Society of Missouri.

Family
He married Mary Jane Royall (1820-1879) of Columbia, Missouri in 1843, and they had three children.

Legacy
Switzler Hall on the David R. Francis Quadrangle at the University of Missouri is named after him.

Works
Switzler, William F., et al. Switzler's illustrated history of Missouri, from 1541 to 1877. St. Louis: C. R. Barns. 1879.
Switzler, William F. History of Boone County, Missouri. Written and comp. from the most authentic official and private sources; including a history of its townships, towns, and villages. Together with a condensed history of Missouri; the city of St. Louis ... biographical sketches and portraits of prominent citizens. St. Louis, Western Historical Company, 1882.

References

External links

1819 births
1906 deaths
Journalists from Missouri
American publishers (people)
University of Missouri curators
Writers from Columbia, Missouri
Missouri Whigs
19th-century American politicians
Burials at Columbia Cemetery (Columbia, Missouri)
19th-century American businesspeople